St George's House, based in the grounds of Windsor Castle, is a British organisation committed to "effecting change for the better by nurturing wisdom through dialogue".

Founded in 1966 by the Prince Philip, Duke of Edinburgh and the then Dean of Windsor, Robin Woods, it brings together people of responsibility and influence in business, government, society and the church to consult on contemporary issues of moment.

Name and mission 
St George's House, the organisation, takes its name from the building of that name in close proximity to and associated with St George's Chapel within the perimeter of the Castle. It belongs to the College of Canons, founded in 1348 and is where participants are hosted for the duration of consultations on given topics. The organisation brings together thinkers from different disciplines and roles in British society with the purpose of investigating means of overcoming some of the major challenges in contemporary society through dialogue.

Association with the Bard
The Vicars' Hall is part of the premises used for consultations. Shakespeare's The Merry Wives of Windsor is claimed to have received its first ever performance in the Vicars' Hall, (built in 1415) in front of Queen Elizabeth I, in 1597, for the festival of the Order of the Garter, though specific evidence for this seems lacking.

Council of St George's House 
The Council of St George's House comprises the Dean and Canons of Windsor, Representative Knights of the Most Noble Order of the Garter and other members.

Representative Knights of the Most Noble Order of the Garter  
 The Duke of Abercorn, KG
 Field Marshal Lord Inge, KG, GCB, PC, DL
 Lord Mervyn King of Lothbury, KG, GBE, FBA

The Dean and Canons of Windsor  
 David Conner, KCVO, The Dean of Windsor
 Hueston Finlay
 Martin Poll
 Mark Powell

Members 
 Leszek Borysiewicz, Kt
 Elita de Klerk
 Baroness Falkner of Margravine
 Mark Moody-Stuart, KCMG
 Admiral Sir James Perowne, KBE, OBE
 Stephen Platten
 Jonathan Romain, MBE
 Robert Woods, CBE
 Claude Hankes, KCVO
 Pips Bunce

Events

Consultations  
St George's House hosts around 60 events for leaders from across society each year. Previous consultations have taken place with Help Rescue the Planet (2012),  the Airey Neave Trust on countering violent extremism (2014), and with the Corsham Institute and  RAND Europe (2016).

St George's House Lectures

The Annual Lecture 
The Annual Lecture was established in 1978 and is sponsored by Rio Tinto. The first lecture was given by Mr Kingman Brewster, then Ambassador of the US in London. The 2016 Lecture was given by Dr Rowan Williams, former Archbishop of Canterbury.

The Elson Ethics Lecture 
The Elson Ethics Lecture is supported by Ambassador Edward Elston to promote discussion and debate on issues of an ethical and moral nature. The 2016 Elson Ethics Lecture was given by the Baroness Manningham-Buller LG DCB, former Director-General of MI5, the Security Service.

Society of Leadership Fellows 
The Society of Leadership Fellows was established in 2016 to recognise the 50th anniversary of the founding of St George's House

In popular media 
St George's House, the Dean of Windsor, and Prince Philip are prominently featured, albeit in a fictionalized series of events, in the seventh episode of the third series of the Netflix series The Crown, "Moondust".

References

External links
 St George's House

Windsor Castle
1966 establishments in the United Kingdom
Organizations established in 1966
Prince Philip, Duke of Edinburgh
Cultural organisations based in the United Kingdom
1966 establishments in England
Non-profit organisations based in England
Social history of the United Kingdom
Organisations based in Berkshire
Windsor, Berkshire